Wings is a song for voice and piano written by Ballard Macdonald and composed by J.S. Zamecnik. Included is also a ukulele arrangement of the song by May Singhi Breen.The song was first published in 1927 by Sam Fox Pub. Co. in Cleveland, Ohio. The sheet music cover illustration features a photograph of Charles Rogers and Clara Bow with a border design of airplanes.

This song was written for the film Wings, directed by William A. Wellman.

The sheet music can be found at the Pritzker Military Museum & Library.

References

Bibliography 
Wellman, William A. 2015. Wild Bill Wellman: Hollywood rebel. New York: Pantheon Books. .

External links
"Wings" sheet music online at the Frances G. Spencer Collection of American Popular Sheet Music

Film theme songs
1927 songs
Songs with lyrics by Ballard MacDonald
Songs written for films